Oscar Vieyra González (born April 19, 1992, in Mexico City) is a professional Mexican footballer who last played for Sporting Canamy.

References

External links
 
 

1992 births
Living people
Mexican footballers
Association football midfielders
Atlante F.C. footballers
Altamira F.C. players
Atlético Estado de México players
Sporting Canamy footballers
Ascenso MX players
Liga Premier de México players
Tercera División de México players
Footballers from Mexico City